The women's flyweight (51 kilograms) event at the 2010 Asian Games took place from 21 to 25 November 2010 at Lingnan Mingzhu Gymnasium, Foshan, China.

Like all Asian Games boxing events, the competition was a straight single-elimination tournament. This was the first ever women's boxing tournament in the history of the Asian Games.

A total of 13 women from 13 countries competed, limited to fighters whose body weight was less than 51 kilograms. Ren Cancan of China won the gold medal. She beat Annie Albania of the Philippines 7–5 in the final bout in Foshan Gymnasium. Mary Kom and Aya Shinmoto shared the bronze medal.

Ren Cancan became the first ever women's boxing champion at the Asian Games.

Schedule
All times are China Standard Time (UTC+08:00)

Results 
Legend
RSC — Won by referee stop contest

References

External links
Official website

Women's 51